The Protein Circular Dichroism Data Bank (PCDDB) is a database of circular dichroism and synchrotron radiation.

See also
 Circular dichroism
 Synchrotron radiation

References

External links
 http://pcddb.cryst.bbk.ac.uk.

Biological databases
Polarization (waves)
Protein structure
Electromagnetic radiation